Emniyet—Fatih is an underground station on the M1 line of the Istanbul Metro. It is located in west-central Fatih under Adnan Menderes Boulevard. Emniyet—Fatih was opened on 3 September 1989 as part of the first rapid transit line in Istanbul and Turkey and is one of the six original stations on the M1 line. The station services several important municipal buildings such as the Istanbul Police Headquarters, Fatih Municipal Building and the Istanbul Tax Offices Directorate.

Layout

References

Railway stations opened in 1989
1989 establishments in Turkey
Istanbul metro stations
Fatih